Prasinoxena hemisema is a species of moth in the family Pyralidae. It was described by Edward Meyrick in 1894. It was found on Sumbawa in Indonesia.

References

External links
Original description: Meyrick, Edward (1894). "On Pyralidina from the Malay Archipelago". Transactions of the Entomological Society of London. 1894: 480.

Pyralidae
Moths described in 1894